Tjaša Jezernik (born 17 June 1977 in Celje) is a Slovenian retired tennis player.

Jezernik won one singles and three doubles titles on the ITF tour in her career. On 4 December 1995, she reached her best singles ranking of world number 416. On 12 September 1994, she peaked at world number 305 in the doubles rankings.

Jezernik made a total of seven appearances for Slovenia in Fed Cup competition.

ITF finals (4–3)

Singles (1–1)

Doubles (3–2)

Fed Cup participation

Doubles

References

External links 
 
 
 

1977 births
Living people
Sportspeople from Celje
Slovenian female tennis players
University of Nevada, Reno alumni